Penelope Williamson (born Fairbanks, Alaska, United States) is an American writer of romance novels under her real name and under the pen names Elizabeth Lambert and Penn Williamson.

Penelope Williamson lives with her husband in Idaho. Her books have been translated into French, German, Dutch, Spanish, Polish, Chinese, Hungarian, Japanese, Swedish, and Russian.

Bibliography

As Penelope Williamson
Beloved Rogue (May 1988)
Hearts Beguiled (June 1989)
A Wild Yearning (1991) - Winner of RITA Award
Keeper of the Dream (April 1992) - Winner of RITA Award
Once in a Blue Moon (May 1993)
Heart of the West	(April 1995)
The Outsider (July 1996)
The Passions of Emma (September 1997) - Nominated for RITA Award
Wages of Sin (March 2003)
The Accident (August 2005)

As Elizabeth Lambert
Wings of Desire (August 1989)

As Penn Williamson
Mortal Sins (June 2000)

References

 

20th-century American novelists
21st-century American novelists
American romantic fiction writers
American women novelists
RITA Award winners
20th-century American women writers
21st-century American women writers
Pseudonymous women writers
Living people
Year of birth missing (living people)
20th-century pseudonymous writers
21st-century pseudonymous writers